Salepur is a town in the district of Cuttack. It is situated near the bank of holy river Chitrotpala mother of Ganga, 25 km from the city of Cuttack and 55 km from the state capital Bhubaneswar.

Name's Relevance
The name Salepur is primarily derived from the combination of two words viz. sali (Paddy) and Pur (Place). It is due to the reason that Salepur belt is one of the largest producers of Paddy in the State of Odisha because of its highly fertile soil.

Transport
By Road: Salepur is well connected to all the nearby cities and towns by roads. SH-9A connects it to NH-16 which connects to Kolkata and Chennai. Besides SH-9A also connects to the nearby cities/towns like Cuttack, Kendrapara, Pattamundai, Rajnagar, Aul, and Chandbali.

By Rail: The nearest major railway station at Cuttack is well connected to most of the cities both within and outside the state, which include New Delhi, Calcutta, Madras, Bhubaneswar, Puri, Vizag, Hyderabad, Agra, Guwahati, and Bangalore.

By Air: The nearest airport at Bhubaneswar (1 hour drive) is one of the major international airports in eastern India and is well connected to all the major cities in the Country.

Major Highway: 9A (Cuttack - Salepur - Kendrapara - Pattamundai - Chandabali)
Major Railway Station: Cuttack (25 km)
Nearest Airport: Biju Patnaik Airport (60 km)
Nearby Cities/Towns: Cuttack (25 km W), Chhatia (20 km N), Kendrapara (30 km E)

Cuisine
The cuisine is specific Oriya food. But this place has the recognition in the field of sweets which are widely prepared and mouth watering delicious.

Rasagolla made by Bikalananda Kar is one of the prime attractions here and also Odisha famous. Canned rasagollas from Salepur are exported to different parts of Odisha, India and abroad. Other Oriya confections, such as Chhena Poda, and Rasaballi are sold here.

Places of interest
Temples: Kulia Hanuman Temple, Kalagni Temple, Saheshwari Temple, Sidheswar Temple, Bateshwara Temple, Biseswara Temple, Gangeswar Shiv temple, Garuda Temple, Jadedeswar temple near badapokari Talapada, Chateswar Temple at Krishna Pur, Sani Temple at Janardanpur & Ananteswar Temple at Lendura Bhagabanpur, Gangeswar Mahadev (Shiv Temple )
Masjids: Madarsa Jamiya Islamia Markazul Uloom (Sungra), Jama Masjid(Guhalipur), Jama Masjid(Daryapur), Jama Masjid (Simalpada), Jama Masjid (Rodhpur, Salipur), Jama Masjid (Barigol), Jama Masjid  (Salarjung), Jama Masjid(kusambi),Jama Masjid(Rasulpur),Jama Masjid(Saipada),Jama Masjid(Sankarpur)
Scenic beauty: Chitrotpala river bank, Kadamkanta jungle.
Asia's second largest and India's largest siphon-cum-bridge is in Salipur.

Fairs and festivals: Munsi Melana (Dola Jatra), Eid-Ul-Fitre & Eid-Ul-Zuha(Sungra Eidgah)

Utkal Mahotsava(Salipur High School Ground), Car festival at Saheshwari Temple, Dusserah, Lakshmi Puja (Manabasa Gurubara) and Kaali Puja, Deepavali, Raja Parba, Saraswati Puja, Ganesh Puja,  Pana Jatra/Patua Jatra at Gangeswar Temple near Raisungura.

Education

Salepur Autonomous College, Institute of  Pharmacy & Technology, a pharmacy college of Odisha
Salipur High School, Salipur {Estd. 1934}
Ekram Rasul High School, Sungra, Salepur Girl's High School, Sarswati Sishu Bidya Mandir, Salipur English medium school, Salipur Public School, Freedom International School,  st. Xavier, etc.
 Nabapravat ITC Salepur, Nabapravat school of Nursing & Nabapravat academy for management education,kashipur,kulia,salepur.
 Salepur Autonomous College, Institute of  Pharmacy & Technology, a pharmacy college of Odisha
Technical institute in sweets (ITI in sweets) and other ITI centers
Jamia Markazul Uloom Sungra, Jamia Rashidiya Riyaz ul uloom,Sungrah, (Muslim University), Madrasa Khadijatul Qubra(Girls Madrasa)

Notable people born in Salepur

Madhusudan Das
Surendra Mohanty

Politics
Current MLA from Salepur (GE) Assembly Constituency is Prasanta Behera (Kunia Bhai) of (BJD). Prakash Behera was the former MLA of Salipur Constituency from 2014-2019 from Indian National Congress(INC). Prior to him Chandra Sarathi Behera was MLA. CS Behera succeeded his father Kalindi Charan Behera. KC Behera held many Cabinet Rank Ministry too. Both Father Son duo from BJD. Before KC Behera Mr Rabi Behera was MLA ( INC) Who was also Son of Mr. Baidhar Behera, Congress ( was also MLA & MP).  In 2019 he changed his party and joined to Bharatiya Janata Party after serving 20 years for INC. Mayadhar Sethi of Congress was also MLA. Salepur Has a Block with a Chairman (SC Reserve) Under Salepur Tehsil.It cleared on 23 May 2019 that Sri. Prasant Behera became the MLA of Salipur.

References

Cuttack
Cities and towns in Cuttack district